Maëlys is a French feminine name of Breton origin. It is the feminine form of the name Maël, meaning "chief" or "prince". The name Maël was popularized by a fifth-century Breton saint Maël. The name is popular in France, where it has ranked in the top 50 names given to baby girls during the past five years. Maëlle, another feminine form of the name Maël, is also popular in France and is ranked in the top 50 names for girls.

Notes

French feminine given names
Breton feminine given names